Zygmunt Chruściński (17 February 1899 – 29 June 1952) was a Polish footballer. He played in nine matches for the Poland national football team from 1924 to 1932.

References

External links
 

1899 births
1952 deaths
Polish footballers
Poland international footballers
Footballers from Kraków
Association football midfielders
MKS Cracovia (football) players